Elisabeth Esterl (born 29 August 1976) is a German professional golfer.

Esterl was born in Dingolfing. She turned professional in 1997 and joined the Ladies European Tour (LET) soon afterwards. She has won two LET tournaments, the 2003 Tenerife Ladies Open and the 2004 KLM Ladies Open. Her best year was 2003, when she finished second on the LET Order of Merit and played for Europe in the Solheim Cup.

Professional wins (3)

Ladies European Tour wins (2)
2003 Tenerife Ladies Open
2004 KLM Ladies Open

Other wins (1)
2000 Princess Lalla Meryem Cup

Team appearances
Amateur
European Ladies' Team Championship (representing Germany): 1995, 1997
Espirito Santo Trophy (representing Germany): 1996

Professional
Solheim Cup (representing Europe): 2003 (winners)
World Cup (representing Germany): 2005

External links

German female golfers
Ladies European Tour golfers
Solheim Cup competitors for Europe
People from Dingolfing-Landau
Sportspeople from Lower Bavaria
1976 births
Living people
20th-century German women
21st-century German women